This list of largest cats shows the 10 largest extant Felidae species, ordered by maximum reported weight and size of wild individuals on record. The list does not contain cat hybrids, such as the liger or tigon.

List 
Following list contains size (weight and length) measurements for wild adult males of each species:

Explanatory notes

References

Cats
Lists of cats